Bruce Gonsalves (26 December 1956 – 6 April 2020) was an Australian rules footballer who played with Collingwood in the Victorian Football League (VFL).

Notes

External links 

Collingwood Forever

1956 births
2020 deaths
Australian rules footballers from Victoria (Australia)
Collingwood Football Club players
Greensborough Football Club players